Grouvelle is a French surname. Notable people with the name include:

 Philippe-Antoine Grouvelle (1758–1806), French writer and journalist
 Laure Grouvelle (1803–1842), French politician
 Antoine Henri Grouvelle (1843–1917), French entomologist

French-language surnames